Alka Yagnik (born 20 March 1966) is an Indian playback singer who works predominantly in Hindi cinema. She has been described in the media as one of the most prominent and successful playback singers in Bollywood. In her career spanning over four decades she has recorded  over 8000 songs for films and albums in various Indian languages and received several accolades including two National Film Awards, two Bengal Film Journalists' Association Awards and a record seven Filmfare Awards for Best Female Playback Singer from a record of thirty-six nominations.

Yagnik is one of the most prolific female playback singers and artists, and has sung a large number of female solos in her Bollywood career. In her career spanning over four decades she has sung songs for more than thousand films and recorded over twenty thousand songs in different Indian languages. Twenty of her tracks feature in BBC's list of top forty Bollywood soundtracks of all-time. She is ranked No.1 on the YouTube's Music Charts & Insights list of top global artists as of January 2023. She has been on the chart for 331 weeks with 371 million views.

Alka Yagnik has been recognized as the most streamed artist in the world by Guinness World Records with 15.3 Billion YouTube views in 2022. The record book further reported that, "Kolkata-born Yagnik, 56, has been the most popular artist on the platform for the past three years, with 17 billion streams in 2021 and 16.6 billion in 2020."

Early life
Yagnik was born in Kolkata on 20 March 1966 to a Gujarati family. Her father's name is Dharmendra Shankar. Her mother Shubha was a singer of Indian classical music. In 1972 at age six, she started singing for Akashvani (All India Radio), Calcutta. At age 10, her mother brought her to Mumbai as a child singer. She was advised to wait until her voice matured, but her mother remained determined. On a subsequent visit, Yagnik got a letter of introduction to Raj Kapoor from his Kolkata distributor. Kapoor heard the girl and sent her with a letter to noted music director Laxmikant. Impressed, Laxmikant gave her two alternatives – an immediate start as a dubbing artist or a later break as a singer; Shubha chose the latter for her daughter. Yagnik mentioned that she was a bright student but didn't like studies.

Career
A classically trained Yagnik began singing bhajans for Akashvani (All India Radio), Calcutta at the age of six. Her first song was for the film Payal Ki Jhankaar in (1980). This was followed by Laawaris (1981) with the song "Mere Angane Mein", followed by the film Hamari Bahu Alka (1982). She got her big break with the song "Ek Do Teen" from the film Tezaab (1988). She has said that she had a high fever on the day she recorded "Ek Do Teen". The song won her the first out of seven Filmfare Award for Best Female Playback Singer. Besides Hindi, she has sung in more than twenty-five languages, besides singing 15 Pakistani songs. including Assamese, Bengali, Gujarati, Malayalam, Marathi, Manipuri, Odia, Punjabi, Bhojpuri, Tamil and Telugu. She has also performed in live concerts around the world. In an interview with Mid-Day, Yagnik told that she records five songs daily during her time.

In 1993, Yagnik sang a seductive song "Choli Ke Peeche Kya Hai" with Ila Arun. The song created controversy because of the lyrics written by Anand Bakshi. She got a second Filmfare award for the song, which she shared with Ila Arun.

In 1994, she sang another seductive song "Din Mein Leti Hai" from the film Amanaat with co-singer Kumar Sanu and Ila Arun, composed by Bappi Lahiri and lyrics by Anwar Sagar. Besides the duet version, she also sang the female version of the song with Ila Arun. She has performed several shows with Kalyanji-Anandji and Laxmikant-Pyarelal.

Throughout the 90s Yagnik along with Kavita Krishnamurthy and Poornima were singing most of the songs for heroines.

Yagnik worked on private albums like "Tum Yaad Aaye" in 1997 in close collaboration with award-winning lyricist Javed Akhtar and composer Raju Singh, "Tum Aaye" in 2002 with Javed Akhtar and singer Hariharan and "Shairana" in 2003 with Javed Akhtar and singer-composer Shankar Mahadevan. She has also performed the Hanuman Chalisa and various devotional songs. Her song "Chamma Chamma" from China Gate was featured in the song "Hindi Sad Diamonds" from the soundtrack of the film Moulin Rouge!.

In 2012 she along with Sonu Nigam sang a song 'Shiksha Ka Suraj' as part of the National Literacy Mission of India for which she was felicitated by Union Minister For Human Resource Development Kapil Sibal. Also in 2012, on the occasion of 100 years of Hindi Cinema, her song "Taal Se Taal Mila" from the movie Taal was voted as the best song of the century in a poll conducted by DesiMartini, Hindustan Times and Fever 104. Also, her song "Choli Ke Peeche" from the movie Khalnayak was voted as the hottest song of the century in a poll conducted by Sanona.

Yagnik has also been involved in various projects to empower girls. In 2014, Yagnik again teamed up with Sonu Nigam to sing the song "Phool Khil Jayenge" for child health awareness. She also sang a song titled "Maine Li Jo Angdai" for the album Women's Day Special: Spreading Melodies Everywhere. It was composed by Farid Sabri, Harish Chauhan, and Gurudatt Sahil; and penned by Sudhakar Sharma.

In 2015, she sung 'Agar Tum Saath Ho' for which she informed that the music director of the song, A.R. Rahman wasn't present in the studio but he was giving instructions on Skype video call and after giving some instructions, he gave power to Yagnik to do any of own style of singing in the song 'Agar Tum Saath Ho'.

Yagnik shares the title for the greatest number of Filmfare Awards with Asha Bhosle (seven) by a female playback singer. She has sung 2,486 Hindi songs in 1,114 films. She is the fifth most prolific Bollywood singer of all time after Asha Bhosle (7886 songs), Mohammed Rafi (7405 songs), Lata Mangeshkar (5596 songs) and Kishore Kumar (2,707 songs). She is the third topmost female playback singer after Lata Mangeshkar and Asha Bhonsle who has sung the maximum number of female solos in her Bollywood career.

Artistry
Yagnik credits her mother as her first guru, who began singing at the age of four. Besides her mother, Alka learned singing from Kalyanji-Anandji and Laxmikant–Pyarelal. Although she has sung many genres of songs but according to Alka, her voice suits the romantic genre best. Alka has acknowledged veteran singer Lata Mangeshkar as her inspiration, She has sung romantic, sad, peppy, seductive and item number songs.

Yagnik has sung more than 9000 songs in over 300 films. Most of her duets were with Kumar Sanu, followed by Udit Narayan and Sonu Nigam. She sang maximum numbers of romantic songs with Kumar Sanu and flamboyant numbers of songs with Udit Narayan and she is known with Kumar Sanu and Udit Narayan, as the trinity of 90s playback singing.

In the media
Yagnik is cited as "the queen of playback singing". On Mother's Day 12 May 2019, Alka became the most-streamed Indian artist-mom on Spotify. The Times of India cited her as 'honey-voiced singer'. Hindustan Times mentioned her as "magical voice". Mid-Day included her in the list of notable 90s playback singers. One of the most well known and leading contemporary singer Sunidhi Chauhan once said that she can't even dream of getting where Lataji, Ashaji and Alkaji (Alka Yagnik) have reached.

Personal life
Yagnik married Shillong-based businessman Neeraj Kapoor in 1989, with whom she has a daughter named Syesha.

Discography

Filmography
Besides singing, Yagnik also judged several singing reality shows on television.

She also appeared in Star Voice of India as a judge. She appears as a guest with Udit Narayan in Sa Re Ga Ma Pa L'il Champs.

Awards and nominations

Yagnik has won several accolades including two National Film Award for Best Female Playback Singer for her songs: "Ghoongat Ki Aad Se" from Hum Hain Rahi Pyar Ke (1993) and "Kuch Kuch Hota Hai" from Kuch Kuch Hota Hai (1998). She has won a record seven Filmfare Award for Best Female Playback Singer for her songs: "Ek Do Teen" from Tezaab (1988), "Choli Ke Peeche Kya Hai" from Khalnayak (1993), "Zara Tasveer Se Tu" from Pardes (1998), "Taal Se Taal" from Taal (2000), "Dil Ne Yeh Kaha Hai Dil Se" from Dhadkan (2001), "O Re Chhori" from Lagaan (2002) and "Hum Tum" from Hum Tum (2005) from a record thirty-six nominations. Additionally she has won two Bengal Film Journalists' Association Awards. For her contribution in the field of music, Yagnik was bestowed with the Lata Mangeshkar Award in 2017.

See also 
 List of Indian playback singers

Notes

References

External links

 
 Alka Yagnik Top MP3 Songs Playlist

1966 births
Living people
Gujarati people
Bengali singers
Singers from Kolkata
Bollywood playback singers
Assamese playback singers
Bengali-language singers
Malayalam playback singers
Marathi-language singers
Punjabi-language singers
Tamil-language singers
Telugu playback singers
Urdu playback singers
Women musicians from West Bengal
21st-century Indian singers
20th-century Indian singers
20th-century Indian women singers
21st-century Indian women singers
Filmfare Awards winners
Screen Awards winners
Zee Cine Awards winners
Best Female Playback Singer National Film Award winners
International Indian Film Academy Awards winners